Rustam Tulkin Ugli Tulaganov (born 8 October 1991) is an Uzbek professional boxer. As an amateur he won a bronze medal at the 2016 Summer Olympics.

Amateur career

Olympic result
Rio 2016
Round of 16: Defeated Julio Castillo (Ecuador) 3–0
Quarter-finals: Defeated Abdulkadir Abdullayev (Azerbaijan) 3–0
Semi-finals: Defeated by Evgeny Tishchenko (Russia) 3–0

Professional career
On 27 October 2017, Tulaganov made his professional debut against Robert Guerra. Tulaganov was taken the full distance as he won via unanimous decision after winning every round on each of the three scorecards. Tulaganov fought for a second time as a professional on 21 December 2019 against Konstantin Piternov. After dominating the entirety of the bout, Tulaganov won via technical knockout in the fourth round after his Russian opponent eventually succumbed to a shoulder injury.

On 1 February 2020, Tulaganov fought against Norbert Dąbrowski. Tulaganov was once again taken the full distance as he secured another comfortable victory via unanimous decision over eight rounds.

Professional boxing record

References

External links

 

1991 births
Living people
Sportspeople from Tashkent
Uzbekistani male boxers
Olympic boxers of Uzbekistan
Boxers at the 2016 Summer Olympics
Medalists at the 2016 Summer Olympics
Olympic bronze medalists for Uzbekistan
Olympic medalists in boxing
Universiade medalists in boxing
Boxers at the 2014 Asian Games
Universiade silver medalists for Uzbekistan
Asian Games competitors for Uzbekistan
Heavyweight boxers
Medalists at the 2013 Summer Universiade
20th-century Uzbekistani people
21st-century Uzbekistani people